The Longnose conger (Bathycongrus wallacei) is an eel in the family Congridae (conger/garden eels). It was described by Peter Henry John Castle in 1968, originally under the genus Congrina. It is a marine, deep water-dwelling eel which is known from the Indo-Western Pacific, including Mozambique, Natal, South Africa, Japan, the Philippines, and Indonesia. It dwells at a depth range of 250–500 metres. Males can reach a maximum total length of 55 centimetres.

References

Bathycongrus
Fish described in 1968